Godspeed is an album by Symphorce, released in 2005.

Track listing
All songs written & arranged by: Franck/Dupont/Wohlbold/Pohl

 "Forsight" – 0:33
 "Everlasting Life" – 4:13
 "No Shelter" – 3:55
 "Nowhere" – 4:39
 "Haunting" – 3:34
 "Black Water" – 3:41
 "Wounds Will Last Within" – 4:10
 "Your Cold Embrace" – 4:15
 "Without a Trace" – 3:29
 "The Mirrored Room" – 5:05
 "Crawling Walls for You" – 5:12

Personnel
 Andy B. Franck – vocals
 Cedric Dupont – guitars
 Markus Pohl – guitars
 Dennis Wohlbold – bass
 Sascha Sauer – drums

References

2005 albums
Symphorce albums
Metal Blade Records albums